Aberdeen is a small town in the upper Hunter Region of New South Wales, Australia, in Upper Hunter Shire. It is 12 kilometres north of Muswellbrook on the New England Highway.

History
In 1828 Thomas Potter McQueen was granted 10,000 acres, and named the small township after George Hamilton-Gordon, 4th Earl of Aberdeen. In 1837 Segenhoe Inn was built, which Potter McQueen named after Segenhoe Manor, in Bedfordshire, where he was born in 1791.
Aberdeen Post Office opened on 1 August 1856.

Population
According to the 2016 census of Population, there were 1,894 people in Aberdeen.
 Aboriginal and Torres Strait Islander people made up 6.7% of the population. 
 86.7% of people were born in Australia and 90.4% of people only spoke English at home.    
 The most common responses for religion were Anglican 34.3%, Catholic 28.2% and No Religion 17.9%.

Today
Aberdeen has its own pre-school, which was founded in 1977. The town contains two schools: the Aberdeen Public School, catering from kindergarten to Grade 6; and  St. Joseph's High School, a Catholic co-educational high school catering for Grades 7 through to 12.

Aberdeen has two churches – St Thomas's Catholic Church, and St Mark's Anglican Church. It once had a third church, St Paul's Uniting Church, which has now been turned into an art gallery called the Artemis Gallery.

St Joseph's Aberdeen High School is located next to St Thomas's Catholic Church.

The town has a local rugby league team, the Aberdeen Tigers.

Aberdeen is on the Main North railway line, and is serviced by a daily XPLorer long-distance service in each direction between Sydney and Armidale, as well as two/three local services in each direction between Scone and Newcastle.

For travellers, there are two main areas for accommodation in the town: the Aberdeen Motel, which is on the southern edge of the town; and the Segenhoe Inn, which is situated towards the northern end of town. The Commercial Hotel is also available for budget accommodation.

Abattoirs

Aberdeen is possibly best known for the former abattoirs in the town centre, which operated for well over 100 years, before the most recent owners - an American company called Conagra - decided to close down their New South Wales abattoirs and concentrate on their Queensland operations. One factor in closing down what was once a very important abattoir for Conagra, was that the financial cost of upgrading the Aberdeen Abattoir was deemed too high, thus the abattoir - which was the largest single employer in Aberdeen - was closed in 1999. Hundreds of people were left without work, and despite promises from both the New South Wales and Federal governments to encourage new businesses to open up in the area, beyond expansion of coal mining and associated industries, nothing of note eventuated

Notable people
 Katherine Knight (born 24 October 1955), murderer who killed her partner, skinned and cooked his  body parts
Joseph Brown (filmmaker) (born 19 May 2004), Australian filmmaker and author

References

External links

Suburbs of Upper Hunter Shire
Towns in the Hunter Region
Hunter River (New South Wales)